The Rawlins County Courthouse is a courthouse in Atwood, Kansas, serving Rawlins County. It was designed by Sioux City, Iowa, architects the Eisentraut-Colby-Pottenger Company.

References

Courthouses in Kansas